Wíres José de Souza or simply Wíres (born December 30, 1982) is a Brazilian defensive midfielder currently playing for Rio Ave.

References

External links
 ESPN FC: Wires José de Souza

1982 births
Living people
Brazilian footballers
Brazilian expatriate footballers
C.R.D. Libolo players
Rio Ave F.C. players
Primeira Liga players
Expatriate footballers in Portugal
Association football defenders